Tierra de Nadie (English No man's land) is the fourth studio album by Mexican pop singer Ana Gabriel. It was released in 1988. She achieved international recognition with this album and it reached number one on the Billboard Latin Pop Albums staying in the chart for 73 weeks. It sold four million worldwide. The album was given a Premio Lo Nuestro award for "Pop Album of the Year" in 1990.

Track listing
Tracks:
 Simplemente Amigos
 Es el Amor Quien Llega
 Soledad (Solidão)
 Por Tí
 Voy Por Tí
 Tierra de Nadie
 Contigo
 No Digas No (Não Diga Adeus)
 Que Puedes Hacer Por Mí
 Recuerdos

Singles
 Simplemente Amigos
 Es el Amor Quien Llega
 No Digas No (Nao Diga Adeus)
 Soledad

Singles charts

Commercial performance
Tierra de Nadie reached number one on the Billboard Latin Pop Albums chart.

See also
List of number-one Billboard Latin Pop Albums from the 1990s

References

1988 albums
Ana Gabriel albums